The Group of Twelve is a group of industrially advanced countries whose central banks co-operate to regulate international finance.

Group of Twelve may also refer to:

 Dozen, a grouping of twelve
 Group of Twelve (Nicaragua), a group of Sandinista National Liberation Front supporters